Robbinsville may refer to:

 Robbinsville, North Carolina
 Robbinsville High School (North Carolina)
 Robbinsville Township, New Jersey
 Robbinsville CDP, New Jersey
 Trenton-Robbinsville Airport
 Robbinsville High School (New Jersey)
 Four Thieves Gone: The Robbinsville Sessions, album by The Avett Brothers